Pamela J. Reed (born February 27, 1961, Palmer, Michigan, United States) is an American ultrarunner who resides in Tucson, Arizona and Jackson, Wyoming. She is the race director for the Tucson Marathon.

In 2002, Reed was the first woman to become the overall winner of the Badwater Ultramarathon. She subsequently repeated as overall winner of the race in 2003. In 2002, her win also set the women's course record.

In 2003, she set the women's record for the USATF 24-hour track run, which was later broken by Camile Herron.

In 2005, she completed a 300-mile run without sleep. She completed the run in slightly less than eighty hours. 

Reed is the current female American record holder in six-day marathons after completing 490 miles in the Twelfth-Annual Self-Transcendence 6- & 10-day Race in New York City. She completed the Multi-day race on Saturday, May 2, 2009.

Reed is the author of the book The Extra Mile: One Woman's Personal Journey to Ultra-Running Greatness Rodale, Inc..

References

External links
 

American female ultramarathon runners
Sportspeople from Tucson, Arizona
1961 births
Living people
21st-century American women